Pendleton is an unincorporated community in Bell County, Texas, United States. Pendleton has a post office with the ZIP code 76564. The community was the birthplace of acclaimed blues musician Blind Willie Johnson and Green Bay Packers Pro Football Hall of Famer Bobby Dillon. 

Pendleton is part of the Killeen–Temple–Fort Hood Metropolitan Statistical Area.

References

External links
 

Unincorporated communities in Bell County, Texas
Unincorporated communities in Texas
Killeen–Temple–Fort Hood metropolitan area